National Highway 365, commonly called NH 365 is a national highway in  India. It is a spur road of National Highway 65.  NH-365 traverses the state of Telangana in India.

Route 
Nakrekal, Arvapally, Tungaturti, Mahbubabad, Narsampet, Mallampalli.

Junctions  
 
  Terminal near Nakrekal.
  near Arvapally.
  near Kuravi.
  Terminal near Mallampalli.

See also 

 List of National Highways in India
 List of National Highways in India by state

References

External links 

 NH 365 on OpenStreetMap

National highways in India
National Highways in Telangana